William Martin Conway, 1st Baron Conway of Allington (12 April 1856 – 19 April 1937), known between 1895 and 1931 as Sir Martin Conway, was an English art critic, politician, cartographer and mountaineer, who made expeditions in Europe as well as in South America and Asia.

Conway was occupied on several university positions and from 1918 to 1931 was a representative of the combined English universities as a conservative member in the House of Commons.

In 1872 he took up mountain climbing and went on expeditions to Spitsbergen from 1896 to 1897 and the Bolivian Andes in 1898. He is an author of books on art and exploration, which include Mountain Memories (1920), ′'Art Treasures of Soviet Russia (1925), and Giorgione as a Landscape Painter (1929).

Background and education
Conway was born at Rochester, England, on 12 April 1856, the son of Reverend William Conway, who later became rector of St. Margaret's, Westminster. He was the youngest of three children having two older sisters, Elizabeth Ann (1852-1916) and Martha (1854-1938). He was educated at Repton and Trinity College, Cambridge, where he studied mathematics and became a close friend of Karl Pearson. He became interested in woodcuts, engraving and early printed books; his History of the Woodcutters of the Netherlands in the Fifteenth Century was published in 1884.

Mountaineering
Conway was a member of the Alpine Club, of which he was president from 1902 to 1904.

In 1892, in the course of an exploring and mountaineering expedition undertaken under the auspices of the Royal Society, the Royal Geographical Society and the British Association, he made an ascent of a subsidiary summit of Baltoro Kangri, claiming a world altitude record with a height of 23,000 ft (7,010 m). However, subsequent measurements have revised his height to 22,322 ft (6,804 m). In 1896–97 he explored the interior of Spitsbergen, and the following year he explored and surveyed the Bolivian Andes, climbing "Sorata" (known today as Ancohuma, 21,086 ft / 6,427 m) and Illimani (21,122 ft / 6,438 m). He also attempted Aconcagua (22,831 ft / 6,959 m) stopping short of the summit by 50-ft and explored Tierra del Fuego making an attempt on Sarmiento. At the Paris exhibition of 1900 he received the gold medal for mountain surveys, and the Founder's Medal of the Royal Geographical Society in 1905.

He served as President of the Alpine Club for 1902–04 and became the first president of The Alpine Ski Club at its inaugural meeting in 1908.

In 1924, Conway evaluated evidence from the 1924 British Mountaineering Expedition and believed George Mallory and Andrew Irvine had climbed Mt. Everest.

Academic career

From 1884 to 1887 Conway was Professor of Art at University College, Liverpool; and from 1901 to 1904 he was Slade Professor of Fine Art at Cambridge University. He was knighted in 1895 for his efforts in mapping 5,180 square km of the Karakoram Range in the Himalayas three years earlier.

In 1889 he published a book concerning his research on Albrecht Dürer. He was assisted in this by the polymath Lina Eckenstein who was the sister of a fellow mountaineer.

Conway was the first Director-General of the Imperial War Museum and a trustee of the National Portrait Gallery from 1922 to 1937. His photograph collection formed the basis of the Conway Library at the Courtauld Institute of Art in London. He was also responsible for the restoration of Allington Castle.

Political career
Conway had been involved in politics for some time, consorting with both major parties allegedly in pursuit of a knighthood and a barony; he received both. He was mentioned as a possible Liberal candidate for Wolverhampton South in early 1900, but withdrew his candidature 'owing to domestic circumstances'. He was elected Unionist Member of Parliament for the Combined English Universities in 1918, serving until 1931, when he was raised to the peerage as Baron Conway of Allington, of Allington in the County of Kent, in the Dissolution Honours.

He died in London on 19 April 1937. The title became extinct on his death.

Works

Scholarly works
 History of the Woodcutters of the Netherlands in the Fifteenth Century, 1884
 Early Flemish Artists, 1887
 The Literary Remains of Albrecht Dürer, 1889
 The Dawn of Art in the Ancient World, 1891, dealing with Chaldean, Assyrian and Egyptian art
 Early Tuscan Art, 1902
 The Crowd in Peace and War, 1915
 Art Treasures of Soviet Russia, 1925
 Giorgione as a Landscape Painter, 1929

Mountaineering and travel works
 Climbing and Exploration in the Karakoram-Himalayas, 1894
 The Alps from End to End, 1895
 The First Crossing of Spitsbergen, 1897
 The Bolivian Andes, 1901
 Aconcagua and Tierra Del Fuego: A Book of Climbing, Travel and Exploration, 1902
 Early Dutch and English Voyages to Spitsbergen in the Seventeenth Century, 1904
 No Man's Land, a History of Spitsbergen from its discovery in 1596 to the beginning of the Scientific Exploration of the Country, 1906
 Mountain Memories, 1920
  "Palestine and Morocco", 1923

Autobiography

  Episodes in a Varied Life, 1932
  The Sport of Collecting'', 1914

References

External links 

 William Martin Conway and Egyptian Excavations
 
 
 

1856 births
1937 deaths
English mountain climbers
Conservative Party (UK) MPs for English constituencies
Members of the Parliament of the United Kingdom for the Combined English Universities
Presidents of the Alpine Club (UK)
Conway of Allington, William Conway, 1st Baron
Conway of Allington, William Conway, 1st Baron
UK MPs 1918–1922
UK MPs 1922–1923
UK MPs 1923–1924
UK MPs 1924–1929
UK MPs 1929–1931
UK MPs who were granted peerages
Directors of the Imperial War Museum
Alumni of Trinity College, Cambridge
Academics of the University of Cambridge
Knights Bachelor
People from Allington, Kent
Barons created by George V